The British Journal of Medical Hypnotism was a peer-reviewed medical journal and an official journal of the British Society of Medical Hypnotists. It was established in 1949 and ceased publication in 1966. It was indexed in PubMed/MEDLINE.

Further reading

See also
Hypnotherapy

References

English-language journals
General medical journals
Hypnosis
Defunct journals of the United Kingdom
Publications established in 1949
Publications disestablished in 1966
1949 establishments in the United Kingdom
1966 disestablishments in the United Kingdom
Academic journals associated with learned and professional societies of the United Kingdom